"Has Anybody Seen My Girl? (Five Foot Two, Eyes of Blue)" is an American popular song that achieved its greatest popularity in the 1920s. It is sometimes known simply as "Has Anybody Seen My Girl?" and sometimes simply as "Five Foot Two, Eyes of Blue"; the 1925 Leo Feist, Inc. sheet music gives both of these.  As of January 1, 2021, the song has fallen into the public domain.

Origin
Accounts of who originally composed "Has Anybody Seen My Girl?" vary, particularly since the song, especially its lyrics, was often modified.  Some sources state that Percy Wenrich wrote the music and Jack Mahoney the lyrics, in 1914.  Credit for the most popular version of the song, though, is given to Ray Henderson for the music, and Sam M. Lewis and Joseph Widow Young for the lyrics.  It was this version that was recorded by The California Ramblers in 1925.

Recordings
The song was first recorded by The California Ramblers (as the Golden Gate Orchestra) in 1925, and has been covered by many other artists since, including Shane Fenton and the Fentones, Arthur Fields, Tiny Hill, Guy Lombardo, Mitch Miller, Dean Martin, Freddy Cannon, Mickey Gilley, Milla Jovovich, and Tim Waurick. Nick Lucas sang the song in a recording that was used in the 1974 movie The Great Gatsby. Bing Crosby included the song in a medley on his album On the Happy Side (1962).  Gene Austin had a #1 in 1926 with his version (titled "Five Foot Two Eyes Of Blue").

Cultural appearances
The 1952 Hollywood comedy film Has Anybody Seen My Gal? was set in the 1920s and used the song, among a few others from that era, but these musical touches were unrelated to the plot. The song was the theme song for TV's The Ina Ray Hutton Show during the 1950s. The song was featured in the 1936 Our Gang short film "The Pinch Singer", performed by a fictional group named "The Plantation Trio". Lucille Ball performs this song in an episode of I Love Lucy, and also in the episode of The Lucy Show titled "Lucy's College Reunion", in both performances playing the ukulele.

In 1984, it was used by the Walter Mondale 1984 presidential campaign to introduce vice-presidential candidate Geraldine Ferraro (who was actually five feet, four inches).

More recently used in CSI: Cyber Season one, episode eight, "Selfie 2.0", the song was referenced when the agents were profiling victims; and, was used as dance music in the 2018 semi-final of Strictly Come Dancing by Stacey Dooley, and her professional partner Kevin Clifton.

Gaga: Five Foot Two is a 2017 documentary film about American singer-songwriter Lady Gaga. The Guy Lombardo version of the song is performed.

Lyrics 
The Jack Mahoney lyrics (1914) are the same as the chorus used in the Sam M. Lewis & Joseph Widow Young version (1925). Minor variations exist in recorded versions — for example, "pearls" and "hers" instead of "fur" and "her".

Five foot two, eyes of blue,
But oh! what those five foot could do,
Has anybody seen my girl?
Turned-up nose, turned-down hose,
Flapper, yes sir, one of those,
Has anybody seen my girl?

Now if you run into a five-foot-two
Covered with fur,
Diamond rings, and all those things,
Bet your life it isn't her,
But could she love, could she woo,
Could she, could she, could she coo!
Has anybody seen my girl?

This is the chorus.  There are two verses as well.

Football popular culture
The song became a popular football terrace chant in England in the late 1960s and early 1970s in homage of players with particularly hard tackling reputations, most notably at Manchester United Football Club player Jim Holton. Fans adapted the lyrics "Six Foot two, eyes of blue, big Jim Holton's after you..."

References

1925 songs
Songs with music by Ray Henderson
Songs with lyrics by Sam M. Lewis
Songs with lyrics by Joe Young (lyricist)